The Icelandic Forest Service (IFS) is a subordinate agency to the Ministry for the Environment and Natural Resources of the Government of Iceland. This governmental institution works not only with and for the government but also for the public and other parties interested. The main subjects are research development, consultation work and the distribution of knowledge and know-how within the Icelandic forest sector. Furthermore, the IFS acts as Iceland's representative body for international forest-related cooperation. The Director of IFS as of 2016 is Mr. Throstur Eysteinsson. The head of research is Ms. Edda Sigurdís Oddsdóttir.

For over a century the IFS has had two main obligations, one being the protection and expansion of remaining native birchwoods in the country, the other executing afforestation projects throughout the country for the purpose of commercial forestry. Afforestation projects have been put through on IFS lands in different locations in Iceland. Furthermore, state supported afforestation on farms has in recent decades grown to become the main channel for afforestation activity in Iceland. Within the Icelandic farm afforestation grants scheme, contracts are made with landowners, afforestation plans are drawn up for each participating farm, seedling production and distribution are coordinated, education and extension services are provided and grants are distributed. State funding of farm afforestation grants reached a maximum during 2005-2009 but suffered severe cut-backs after the 2008 financial collapse. Planting is now on the rise again after a decade of stagnation. In recent years, with ever clearer signs of global warming, carbon sequestration has become one of the most important drivers of new afforestation projects in Iceland.

Iceland has been almost entirely devoid of trees, the trees having been cut down since Viking times, when Iceland had up to 40% woodland cover. The forest service has a programme to encourage people to grow trees in Iceland, planting millions of seedlings each year. Iceland currently has about 2% forest cover.

References

External links
 

Government of Iceland
Forestry in Iceland